Manuel Gelito Ott (born 6 May 1992) is a professional footballer who plays as a midfielder for Malaysian club Kedah Darul Aman. Born in Germany, he represents the Philippines national team.

Born and raised in Germany, he started his professional career with the second team of FC Ingolstadt. He then had two spells with Filipino club Ceres/United City where he won four league titles.

At international level, he represents the Philippines, for whom he is eligible through his mother. He has taken part in the Southeast Asian Games, AFF Championship, and AFC Asian Cup. His younger brother Mike is also a footballer and has been his teammate for both club and country.

Club career
Born in Munich, Ott had his youth career at SV Ilmmünster, FSV Pfaffenhofen, and TSV 1860 Munich before joining FC Ingolstadt II in 2009.

In July 2014, Ott was signed by Ceres of the United Football League (UFL), the de facto top level in the Philippines. Ceres finished as runners-up of the 2015 UFL Cup, although Ott missed the final due to suspension after accumulating two yellow cards. That year, Ceres also won UFL Division 1. In the 2016 UFL Cup, he played in the final where they lost 3–1 to Global. Ceres finished second in that year's UFL. In their last match of the season, against JP Voltes, Ott received a red card for disrespecting the referee.

In the 2017 AFC Cup group stage, Ott contributed a goal in Ceres' 5–0 home thrashing of Tampines Rovers. In the ASEAN zonal final, he sealed their 3–2 aggregate win over Home United by scoring the winning goal in the second leg which ended 2–0. He featured in the Inter-zone play-off semifinal, where they were eliminated by Istiklol. In the domestic level, the UFL was replaced by the Philippines Football League (PFL) as the official top tier division. Ceres–Negros won the league's inaugural title.

In the 2018 preseason, his brother Mike was signed by Ceres–Negros. In the AFC Cup group stage, Ott contributed a goal in their 9–0 thrashing of Boeung Ket, one of the biggest  wins in the tournament's history. He later scored against Yangon United in the second leg of the ASEAN zonal semifinal. Despite losing the match, Ceres won the tie 6–5 on aggregate. The Ott brothers did not feature in the second leg of the ASEAN zonal final due to yellow cards from previous games. In a rematch with Home United, Ceres lost 3–1 on aggregate. For their PFL opening match, the Ott brothers scored a goal each as Ceres defeated Kaya–Iloilo 2–1. Ceres–Negros went on to defend their league title.

In January 2019, Ott joined Ratchaburi Mitr Phol in the Thai League 1. However, in February, he sustained a shin injury during preseason training and was expected to be sidelined for three months. As of August, he remained sidelined. On 2 October, Ott made his Thai League 1 debut entering as a second-half substitute for compatriot Amin Nazari in a 2–2 draw with Sukhothai. On 20 October, he started in Ratchaburi's home match against Bangkok United which also ended in a 2–2 draw.

Ott re-joined Ceres–Negros on 6 February 2020. On 11 February, he started in Ceres' first AFC Cup match of the season against Cambodian champions Svay Rieng. As Ott was dribbling towards the goal, his teammate Bienve Marañón stole the ball and scored the third goal in their 4–0 win. He was credited with an assist for the play. When Ceres–Negros became United City after an ownership change in mid-2020, the Ott brothers were re-signed by the new owners. In their last PFL match of the season, he scored the consolation goal in their 2–1 loss to Kaya–Iloilo, the club's first domestic defeat in two years. Nonetheless, United City won the 2020 PFL. In December 2020, United City announced that Ott transferred to a Malaysian club.

Malaysia Super League club Melaka United announced the signing of Ott in January 2021.

He signed with Terengganu for the 2022 season, and Kedah Darul Aman for the 2023 season.

International career
In 2010, a scout tasked to find eligible players in Europe for the Philippine national team invited Ott for a trial training camp in Taiwan. At that time, Ott was unaware that the Philippines had a national football team. He made his international debut for the Philippines on 16 January 2010 against Chinese Taipei. He played 60 minutes in a goalless draw. In June to July 2011, he featured in the 2014 FIFA World Cup qualifiers where they beat Sri Lanka but were eliminated by Kuwait. In December that year, he played in the 6–1 friendly defeat to LA Galaxy which featured David Beckham.

He was a late addition in the Philippines U23 squad for the 2011 Southeast Asian Games after initially backing out due to other commitments. In their opening match, he scored Philippines' only goal in the 3–1 defeat to Vietnam. He then scored the opening goal in their 3–2 win over Laos, the Philippines' only win in the campaign.

Ott scored his first senior international goal in a 3–0 friendly win over Cambodia on 14 November 2014. Two weeks later, in the 2014 AFF Championship, he contributed a goal in Philippines' first-ever win over Indonesia. Philippines reached the semi-finals of the tournament.

In 2015 and 2016, he played in the qualifying matches for the 2018 FIFA World Cup and 2019 AFC Asian Cup. In one such match, on 29 March 2016, he scored against North Korea in a 3–2 win. On 7 October, Ott and his brother Mike played their first international match together as the latter scored on his debut in a 3–1 friendly loss to Bahrain. In November, the Ott brothers featured in the 2016 AFF Championship but the team failed to clear the group stage.

In 2017 and 2018, Ott featured in the third round of qualifiers for the 2019 Asian Cup. Their 2–1 win over Tajikistan on 27 March 2018 sealed their qualification for their first-ever Asian Cup campaign. Ott also played in the 2018 AFF Championship. However, due to injury, he missed the second leg of the semi-finals in which Vietnam eliminated the Philippines.

The 2019 AFC Asian Cup was Philippines' first-ever appearance in the tournament. Ott played in all three matches of their winless campaign.

International goals
Scores and results list the Philippines' goal tally first, score column indicates score after each Ott goal.

Personal life
Ott was born to a German father and a Filipina mother from Boracay. He has two younger brothers, twins Mike and Marco. The Ott brothers grew up in Pfaffenhofen, Germany though they visited their mother's homeland almost annually. Manuel settled in the Philippines in 2014 and Mike followed in 2017. Ott is also known as "Manny".

Honours
Ceres–Negros / United City
 Philippines Football League: 2017, 2018, 2020
United Football League: 2015
 United Football League Cup runner-up: 2015, 2016

Notes

References

External links 

1992 births
Living people
German sportspeople of Filipino descent
Citizens of the Philippines through descent
Filipino people of German descent
German footballers
Filipino footballers
Philippines international footballers
Association football midfielders
Footballers from Munich
FC Ingolstadt 04 players
TSV 1860 Munich players
Ceres–Negros F.C. players
FC Ingolstadt 04 II players
2019 AFC Asian Cup players
Manny Ott
Melaka United F.C. players
German expatriate footballers
Filipino expatriate footballers
German expatriate sportspeople in Thailand
Filipino expatriate sportspeople in Thailand
Expatriate footballers in Thailand
German expatriate sportspeople in Malaysia
Filipino expatriates in Malaysia
Expatriate footballers in Malaysia
Terengganu FC players
Kedah Darul Aman F.C. players